Nagareboshi (流れ星; 流れ nagare, “flow, stream” + 星 hoshi, “star”), is Japanese for shooting star, may refer to:

 Nagareboshi (Mika Nakashima song), by Mika Nakashima
 Nagareboshi (Misia song), by Misia
 Nagareboshi (TV series), 2010 Japanese television drama

See also
 Ryūsei (disambiguation)
 Shooting star (disambiguation)